Edinburgh, the capital city of Scotland, is a powerhouse of the Scottish economy, as well as the wider UK economy. Edinburgh has been consistently one of the most prosperous parts of the country and has the strongest economy of any city in the UK outside London. Financial Times FDi Magazine has named Edinburgh as the "Best Large European City of the Future" and "Best Foreign Direct Investment Strategy (Large City)" for 2012/13.

Edinburgh was ranked the 13th largest financial centre internationally and the 4th largest in Europe in 2020.

Economic profile
 In 2011, the population of Edinburgh was estimated at 476,600, which was an increase of 28,000 on the figure from 2001 which stood at 448,600.
 The city has the second-highest gross value added (GVA) per resident (behind London) in major UK cities, with the average being £34,178 per resident.
 The employment rate for the city stood at 73.6% for Q1 of 2013, which was higher than the rate for Scotland as a whole, which stood at 71.8%.
 The city has the lowest percentage of total working age residents claiming Jobseeker's Allowance of major UK cities at 3.2% as of December 2012.
 Edinburgh is second only to London in average gross annual earnings per resident in major UK cities, with an average salary of £27,800.

Top employers

The table below shows the top employers in terms of employee numbers in the City of Edinburgh:

This next table highlights the number of people in employment in the City of Edinburgh by industrial sector:

Key sectors

Financial services

Edinburgh is the second largest financial centre in the United Kingdom, after the City of London, and the fourth in Europe by equity assets.

Edinburgh has been a centre of banking for over 300 years; the Bank of Scotland was founded in 1695, by an act of the original Parliament of Scotland and is now part of Lloyds Banking Group, who have retained the Scottish headquarters in Edinburgh. The Royal Bank of Scotland (RBS) was founded in 1727 by royal charter. In 2000, RBS acquired National Westminster Bank in the biggest banking takeover in British history. It is now part of the NatWest Group, who have also retained the Edinburgh headquarters, operating from a complex at Gogarburn since 2005. TSB, Tesco Bank, Sainsbury’s Bank, and Virgin Money also have headquarters in the city.

In insurance terms, indigenous Edinburgh companies such as Standard Life and Scottish Widows form a large part of the European insurance sector as well as being major employers in the city. Scottish Widows was founded in 1815, managing £145.79 billion worth of funds at June 2013 with a workforce of around 3,500.

The New Town and city centre has traditionally been home to many companies, in the banking, finance and legal professions, but modern needs have caused many to relocate. Immediately to the west of the city centre is the Terry Farrell master-planned Exchange business district, which now houses major employers such as Scottish Widows, Standard Life, the Clydesdale Bank, and Baillie Gifford.

Edinburgh Park is one of the largest business parks in the UK and is located on the western periphery of city, near Edinburgh Airport. The park was opened in 1992 alongside the large out-of-town shopping development at South Gyle and is close to major routes such as the A8, the M8 motorway and the A720 Edinburgh City Bypass and now has its own railway station. Close to Edinburgh Park at Gogarburn, the Royal Bank of Scotland have opened their global headquarters. HSBC, Royal Bank, Diageo, J. P. Morgan, Telewest, BT, Fujitsu and Lloyds Banking Group have all established large offices in this park. Following the opening of the Royal Bank's new headquarters, there will be around 20,000 people working in the western outskirts of the city.

Technology and software

Edinburgh has an estimated 17,136 people working within digital companies. The technology sector has grown upon the expertise within the city’s universities. The city has seen a growth in the number of software companies in the city over the last 10 years and there are now more than 100. These include travel search website Skyscanner and one day fantasy sports provider FanDuel who have grow within the city. Rockstar North (formerly DMA Design), known for creating the Grand Theft Auto series, is also based in Edinburgh. Several large corporates have invested in Edinburgh including Amazon Development Centre Scotland and Microsoft.
The School of Informatics is the UK’s largest and longest established research group in informatics. In the REF 2014 assessment for computer science and informatics the School of Informatics has produced more "world-leading" and "internationally excellent" research (4* and 3-star) than any other university in the UK.

A large number of technology companies are based in the area around the University of Edinburgh.

Retail
Edinburgh has not had as large or as significant a retail sector compared to Glasgow, however large out-of-town shopping developments have taken place in recent years, such as the Gyle development in 1993 and the Fort Kinnaird shopping complex located to the east of the city. The St. James Centre and Princes Mall started in the 1970s, then Cameron Toll in the 1980s. More recent developments are the Gyle centre next to Edinburgh Park, Ocean Terminal in Leith and the retail parks at Hermiston Gait, Straiton and Fort Kinnaird which are all next to the Edinburgh City Bypass. Edinburgh has many modern supermarkets in its suburbs which offer a more day-to-day type of shopping. As a shopping centre, particularly Princes Street, Edinburgh suffered some decline for a number of years, but since 2005 has seen the City centre yield rise in comparison to other similarly sized cities. Recent attempts to encourage shoppers back into the city centre have included, the development of top brand department stores on George Street and St Andrew Square and plans to redevelop Princes Street and the St. James Centre in the future.

Tourism
Tourism is another important mainstay of the economy of Edinburgh, supporting 30,000 jobs in the city worth £1.6 billion to the city economy. In 2011, visitor spending was £1.16 billion, compared to £250 million in 1990. Edinburgh is Scotland's most popular tourist destination in terms of visitor numbers, with numbers growing substantially each year, particularly in the budget travel and backpacking sector, assisted by the growth of Edinburgh Airport and direct rail links to the rest of the country. The annual Edinburgh Festival attracts record numbers, as does the Hogmanay street party each New Year, with over 4.3 million visitors attending Edinburgh's various festival events over 2012. The Edinburgh Festivals in August alone generate in excess of £100 million for the Edinburgh economy. Another component of Edinburgh's tourist industry is business and conference tourism, which generates in excess of £74m for the city. Edinburgh is the UK's most popular conference destination, ahead of both London and Glasgow. Visitors are attracted by the UNESCO World Heritage Sites of the Old Town and the New Town as well as the history and culture of the city most visible in tourist attractions such as Edinburgh Castle and the Palace of Holyroodhouse.

Public sector
Edinburgh is the centre of Scotland's government and legal system. As a consequence many government departments and public sector agencies are headquartered in the city as well as the High Court of Justiciary and the centres of Scotland's legal establishment. As a centre of Scots law, the legal profession has had a long presence in Edinburgh, with many premises in the New Town belonging to legal practices and firms.  Many ancillary economic undertakings and political pressure groups have thus set up around this new seat of government leading to a boom in the recruitment and employment of public sector officials. The City of Edinburgh Council and the National Health Service are the two largest employers in the City.

Education

Edinburgh is a major centre of education in the United Kingdom, and has been since the establishment of the University of Edinburgh in 1583, with another three major higher education institutions in the city developing later. Education and academic research (including medical research) plays a significant role in the economy of the city. The presence of these educational institutions also attracts many overseas students and those from the rest of the UK. There is currently a student population of 57,850 enrolled in universities across the city.

Life sciences and microelectronics in particular and have grown in prominence in recent years. The University of Edinburgh is a leader in the fields of medicine and law, and was a pioneer in British artificial intelligence teaching. Heriot-Watt University specialises in science and engineering and Napier University in the fields of computing and business, as well as creative fields.

The city is also home to a number of independent schools, with around one in five school-age pupils attending private institutions.

Infrastructure
The city is linked internationally by Edinburgh Airport (EDI) which in 2018 saw 14.3 million passengers throughout the year, which makes Edinburgh Airport the busiest Scottish Airport and sixth busiest in the UK.

In terms of rail connections, Edinburgh Waverley railway station is the principal mainline station in the city serving over 22.5 million passenger journeys over 2011–12.

The city is also well served by its bus service, with Lothian Buses having its headquarters in Edinburgh. Over 70 services run throughout the city, which includes a direct link to the airport and open top buses for city tours.

The Edinburgh Trams, completed in May 2014, consist of 15 tram stops along the single 14 km (8.7 mi) line. The route links Edinburgh Airport in the West, to York Place in the East.

Challenges

Regeneration
Derelict land and areas on the waterfront of Edinburgh at places like Granton and Leith are in the process of being regenerated to make way for mixed commercial, residential and industrial developments to further provide for the forecast growth of the city.

Urban growth
In an economic sense Edinburgh is constrained by its relatively small size, and that there are economic benefits to be had with greater collaboration with surrounding areas such as Glasgow. Edinburgh itself is ringed by greenbelt land, which has seen developments such as the offices at Edinburgh Park and housing and commercial developments to the south of Edinburgh spring up on it.

See also
 Economy of Scotland
 Economy of the United Kingdom
 Economy of the European Union
 Politics of Edinburgh
 Transport in Edinburgh

References

External links

 Edinburgh Economy Watch (for the latest economic trends)
 City of Edinburgh Economic Data
 Edinburgh by Numbers Facts and Figures Booklet 2010/11
  Edinburgh's Economic Strategy